Eucalyptus archeri, also known as alpine cider gum, is a mallee or a small tree that is endemic to Tasmania. It has smooth white or greyish bark, lance-shaped adult leaves, flower buds in groups of three, white flowers and conical to barrel-shaped fruit. It intergrades with E. gunnii.

Description
Flowering occurs between November and May and the flowers are white.

Eucalyptus archeri is similar to and intergrades with E. gunnii but lacks the bluish grey flower buds and fruit of that species.

Taxonomy and naming
Eucalyptus archeri was first formally described in 1929 by Joseph Maiden and William Blakely and the description was published in Maiden's book A critical revision of the genus Eucalyptus. The specific epithet (archeri) honours William Archer, secretary of the Royal Society of Tasmania.

Distribution and habitat
Apple cider gum is found at altitudes above , on the northern slopes of the Central Plateau and forms the tree line at Ben Lomond. It grows in shallow soil among rock outcrops on mountain tops and in open woodland.

See also

List of Eucalyptus species

References

Trees of Australia
archeri
Flora of Tasmania
Plants described in 1929